Winifred Susan Blackman (1872–1950) was a British egyptologist, archaeologist and anthropologist. She was one of the first women to take up anthropology as a profession.

Family and education 
Blackman was born in Norwich to Rev. James Henry Blackman and Mary Anne Blackman (née Jacob). She was one of five children, and her brother Aylward M. Blackman also became a noted egyptologist. The Blackwood family later moved to Oxford.

Blackman registered to study at the Pitt Rivers Museum from 1912 to 1915, taking the Diploma in Anthropology at the University of Oxford. She also worked on cataloguing collections at the Pitt Rivers Museum between 1912 and 1920, and donated some objects to the museum.

Academic career 
Blackman spent much of the 1920s and 1930s living and working in Egypt. She and her brother Aylward often collaborated. She had a particular interest in "magico-religious" ideas and practices.

In 1927 she published The Fellahin of Upper Egypt, which became a standard work on the ethnography of the region. Unusually for the time, she chose to focus on the habits, beliefs and customs of contemporary (rather than ancient) Egyptians.

That same year she also began collecting ethnographic objects for the wealthy collector Sir Henry Wellcome. She was forced to accept stringent conditions in return for his support (including a promise not to collect anything for anyone else, including herself). She collected an estimated 4,000 individual items for him between 1926 and 1933.

After the Second World War broke out in 1939, Blackwood returned to Britain. In 1950 she was committed to a mental hospital after suffering a mental and physical breakdown after the death of her younger sister Elsie. She died shortly afterwards, aged 78.

Selected works 

 'The Magical and Ceremonial Uses of Fire' Folklore Vol. 27, No. 4  (1916), pp. 352–377
 'The Rosary in Magic and Religion' Folklore Vol. 29, No. 4  (1918), pp. 255–280
 'Traces in Couvade (?) in England' Folklore Vol. 29, No. 4  (1918), pp. 319–321
 'Some beliefs among the Egyptian peasants with regard to 'afarit'' Folklore Vol. 35, No. 2  (1924), pp. 176–184
 The Fellahin of Upper Egypt: Their Religious, Social and Industrial Life To-Day with Special Reference to Survivals from Ancient Times (1927) [later translated into French (1948), and Arabic (1995)]

References

1872 births
1950 deaths
British ethnologists
British Egyptologists
British anthropologists
British women anthropologists
British archaeologists
British women archaeologists
People associated with the Pitt Rivers Museum